The 1904 United States presidential election in Indiana took place on November 8, 1904. All contemporary 45 states were part of the 1904 United States presidential election. State voters chose 15 electors to the Electoral College, which selected the president and vice president.

Indiana was won by the Republican nominees, incumbent President Theodore Roosevelt of New York and his running mate Charles W. Fairbanks of Indiana.

Results

See also
 United States presidential elections in Indiana

Notes

References

Indiana
1904
1904 Indiana elections